James Grauerholz (born December 14, 1953) is a writer and editor. He is the bibliographer and literary executor of the estate of William S. Burroughs.

Life and career
Grauerholz was born in Coffeyville, Kansas and attended the University of Kansas for a year before dropping out and traveling to New York City. By his own admission, he was fascinated with Beat Generation literature and authors.

Grauerholz became acquainted with Burroughs in the 1970s while befriending Allen Ginsberg in New York City. Ginsberg recommended Grauerholz to Burroughs as a possible assistant and their working relationship began in this simple manner, yet grew to be a major factor in the popularization of Burroughs and his works. Grauerholz became Burroughs's friend and business manager until the author's death in 1997.

Grauerholz helped edit a trilogy of novels: Cities of the Red Night (1981), The Place of Dead Roads (1985) and The Western Lands (1987). He acted as Burroughs's business manager, spearheading reading tours in the 1980s and 1990s, and wrote editorial copy for Interzone, a compilation of stories. He quit working for Burroughs and returned to Kansas in the early 1980s, and this quickly led Burroughs to relocate to the Midwestern university town of Lawrence, Kansas, to work more closely with Grauerholz again.  Up until Burroughs' death in 1997, Grauerholz supported him, getting him reading engagements, commercial advertisements (Nike shoes), and parts in films (Drugstore Cowboy), as well as recording Burroughs' readings. He looked after Burroughs's physical needs as well, taking him to a methadone clinic in Kansas City weekly, as well as providing him with companionship and acting as a kind of social secretary to the many people that came to Kansas to meet Burroughs .

Grauerholz wrote biographical sketches to a Burroughs reader Word Virus, and edited a posthumous release of Burroughs diaries Last Words: The Final Journals of William S. Burroughs. Grauerholz worked on a full-length biography on Burroughs, but reportedly handed his writings and other material in the project to Barry Miles in March 2010. The book, "Call Me Burroughs: A Life", was published in 2014, with Miles as the sole author.

Works as editor or co-editor of William Burroughs
Cities of the Red Night, 1981
The Place of Dead Roads, 1985
The Western Lands, 1987
My Education: A Book of Dreams, 1995
Interzone, 1985
Last Words: The Final Journals of William S. Burroughs, 2000

Audio productions
Naked Lunch (Warner, 1995)
Let Me Hang You (Khannibalism, 2016)
both recordings produced by Grauerholz and Hal Wilner with music by Wayne Horvitz, Bill Frisell and Eyvind Kang

Works as author 
Grauerholz, James and Ira Silverberg. (2000) Word Virus: The William S. Burroughs Reader. Grove Press. (Editor and author of biographical sketches preceding each chapter). 
Grauerholz, James. The Death of Joan Vollmer Burroughs: What Really Happened?. American Studies Department, University of Kansas. Online.

References

External links 
Shooting Joan Burroughs at Beats in Kansas. William Burroughs and James Grauerholz, his editor, heir and adopted son, at Burroughs' Lawrence, KS home in 1997, the last year of Burroughs' life.
Author Barry Miles recalls relationships with Beatles, Burroughs and Swinging London March 2010

1953 births
Living people
Beat Generation people
People from Coffeyville, Kansas
William S. Burroughs
American book editors